Seo Gyeong-deok (18 March 1489 – 13 August 1546) was a Korean Neo-Confucianist philosopher during the Joseon Dynasty. His philosophy studied materialism and phenomenology based on ancient taoist philosophy theories absorbed by neoconfucianism, like Yin and Yang and Ki.

Family 
 Father - Seo Ho-beon (서호번, 徐好蕃)
 Grandfather - Seo Sun-gyeong (서순경, 徐順卿)
 Great-Grandfather - Seo Deuk-bu (서득부, 徐得富)
 Mother - Lady Han of the Boan Han clan (보안 한씨, 保安 韓氏)
 Sibling(s)
 Younger brother - Seo Sung-deok (서숭덕, 徐崇德)
 Wives and their issue
 Lady Yi of the Taein Yi clan (태안 이씨, 泰安 李氏); daughter Yi Gye-jong (이계종; ? - 7 January 1561)
 Son - Seo Eung-ga (서응가, 徐應暇)
 Son - Seo Eung-gi (서응기, 徐應麒)
 Grandson - Seo Woo-shin (서우신, 徐佑申)
 Granddaughter - Lady Seo of the Dangseong Seo clan (당성 서씨)
 Grandson-in-law - Im Ryeon (임련, 任鍊)
 Granddaughter - Lady Seo of the Dangseong Seo clan (당성 서씨)
 Grandson-in-law - Yi Eung-jo (이응조, 李應祚)
 Granddaughter - Lady Seo of the Dangseong Seo clan (당성 서씨)
 Granddaughter - Lady Seo of the Dangseong Seo clan (당성 서씨)
 Daughter - Lady Seo of the Dangseong Seo clan (당성 서씨)
 Son-in-law - Yu Gyeong-dam (유경담, 柳景湛)
 Grandson - Yu Ik (유익, 柳益)
 Granddaughter - Lady Yu (유씨)
 Grandson-in-law - Yun Bok (윤복, 尹福)
 Granddaughter - Lady Yu (유씨)
 Grandson-in-law - Kang Ho-seon (강호선, 康好善)
 Unnamed concubine
 Son - Seo Eung-bong (서응봉, 徐應鳳)
 Grandson - Seo Chun-hak (서춘학, 徐春鶴)
 Grandson - Seo Woon-hak (서운학, 徐雲鶴)
 Son - Seo Eung-gu (서응구, 徐應龜)

Works
Seo was a great scholar of the day. He counted among his students the famed gisaeng Hwang Jini, for whom he wrote this sijo:

Other works:

 Hwadamjip (화담집, 花潭集) - collection of his writings
 Woniki (원이기, 原理氣) - About origin of Qi
 Igiseol (이기설, 理氣說) - about processing of Qi
 Taeheoseol (태허설, 太虛說) - About Mu of Qi
 Gwisin sasaengnon (귀신사생론, 鬼神死生論) - about spirit of soul and life and death.

Disciples
 Hwang Jin-yi - Korean poet and artist
 Heo Gyun  - Korean novelist, philosopher, and politician
 Yi Ji-ham (이지함) - Korean astrologer, diviner, and politician
 Heo Nanseolheon - Korean poet
 Han Baek-gyeom (한백겸) - Geographer and philosopher
 Park Sun (박순)  - Philosopher and politician

References

1489 births
1546 deaths
16th-century Korean poets
Korean Confucianists
Korean Taoists
16th-century Korean philosophers